Leo ‘Ledge’ Epifania (born 23 October 1963) is an Australian professional rugby league coach who is the head coach of Italy and a former professional rugby league footballer who played in the 1980s as a  or er in the NSWRL Premiership for the Western Suburbs Magpies and Illawarra Steelers. 

He played, he later coached the York Wasps in the Northern Ford Premiership., and as of 2015 he is the General Manager of the Western Suburbs Magpies in the New South Wales Cup.

He was assistant coach of the Italian National Rugby League team during the 2016 world Cup Qualifiers in Europe against Serbia, Wales and Russia.

In 2017 he coached the Italian National Rugby League team against Malta for a draw and then was in charge of the Italian team which played in 2018 against Sth Africa (Italy 18 - Sth Africa 8) and Niue (Italy 36 - 32).

In 2019 he coached the Italian National Rugby League team to successful qualification for the 2021 Rugby League World Cup.

References

1963 births
Living people
Australian rugby league coaches
Australian rugby league players
Illawarra Steelers players
Italy national rugby league team coaches
Place of birth missing (living people)
Rugby league fullbacks
Rugby league wingers
Western Suburbs Magpies players
York Wasps coaches